Inđić, also transcribed as Indjić, is a Serbian surname. Notable people with the surname include:

Aleksandar Inđić (born 1995), Serbian chess grandmaster
Đorđe Inđić (born 1975), Bosnian Serb football manager and former footballer
Eugen Indjic (born 1947), Serbian-born American pianist
Trivo Inđić (born 1938), Serbian sociologist

Serbian surnames